Trachymene coerulea  (common name - blue-lace flower) is a herb in the family Araliaceae. It is native to Western Australia.

Trachymene coerulea was first described by Robert Graham in 1828, from a plant grown from seed sent to Edinburgh by Charles Fraser, the New South Wales colonial botanist.

The plant is endemic to the south-west of Western Australia.

Aboriginal uses 
Mashed bulbs and leaves were used as a body rub to relieve aches and pains. Vapours from the crushed leaves were inhaled for headaches.

References

External links 

 Trachymene coerulea occurrence data from The Australasian Virtual Herbarium

coerulea
Plants described in 1828
Taxa named by Robert Graham
Flora of Western Australia